Rufus Pollock (born 1980) is a British economist, activist and social entrepreneur. He has been a leading figure in the global open knowledge and open data movements, starting with his founding in 2004 of the non-profit Open Knowledge Foundation which he led until 2015. From 2007-2010 he was the Mead Fellow in Economics at Emmanuel College, Cambridge and from 2010-2013 he was a Shuttleworth Foundation fellow. In 2012 was appointed an Ashoka Fellow and remains an Associate of the Centre for Intellectual Property and Information Law at the University of Cambridge and continues to serve on the board of Open Knowledge International. Since leaving Open Knowledge International, his work has moved to focus more on broader issues of social transformation and in 2016 he co-founded a new non-profit "Life Itself". However, he has continued to work actively on the economics and politics of the information age, including publishing "The Open Revolution: Rewriting the Rules of the Information Age" in 2018.

In addition to his academic work, whilst at Open Knowledge International he initiated a wide variety of projects, many of which continue to be active today. For example, in 2005 he created The Open Definition which provided the first formal definition of open content and open data, and which has remained the standard reference definition. In 2005–2006 he created the first version of CKAN, open source software for finding and sharing datasets, especially open datasets. CKAN has continued to evolve and today is the leading open data platform software in the world used by governments including the US and UK to publish millions of public datasets.

He also helped to lead or co-found several other organizations including Open Rights Group (2005, co-founder and board member), Foundation for a Free Information Infrastructure (2005-6, UK director), Creative Commons UK, Datopian (founder) and Life Itself (co-founder).

Work 
On 24 May 2004 Pollock founded in Cambridge, UK the Open Knowledge Foundation as a global non-profit network that promotes and shares open knowledge including open data and open content - information that is openly and freely available.

In 2007 and 2009, Pollock published two important papers regarding the optimal copyright term, where he proposed based on an economical model with empirically-estimable parameters an optimal duration of only 15 years, significantly shorter than any currently existing copyright term.

He has held the Mead Research Fellowship in economics at Emmanuel College, Cambridge.

In 2009, he was credited by web inventor Tim Berners-Lee for starting the Raw Data Now meme.

In 2010 he was appointed as one of the four founding members of the UK Government's Public Sector Transparency Board.

In 2018 he published his first book The Open Revolution: Rewriting the Rules of the Information Age, making it openly available for download online.

Bibliography

 The Open Revolution: Rewriting the Rules of the Information Age (2018)

References

External links 

 Personal website and autobiography
 Interview with Guardian.co.uk
 Give Us the Data Raw, and Give it to Us Now ─ the blog post from Rufus Pollock that inspired Tim Berners-Lee
 Open Knowledge International
 Shuttleworth Fellowship
 Ashoka Fellowship
 CKAN Project
 Digital Revolution Talk at re:publica 
 Building a Sustainable Digital Age Talk in Geneva
 Access of Knowledge Video by WeShift
 A Better World Video
 Frictionless Data Video and blogpost
 Thoughts on Blockchain Video and article

Living people
British activists
1980 births
Open content activists
People educated at Oundle School
Ashoka Fellows